Mecynoecia is a genus of bryozoans belonging to the family Entalophoridae.

The genus has almost cosmopolitan distribution.

Species:

Mecynoecia angustata 
Mecynoecia bajocina 
Mecynoecia bellidis 
Mecynoecia benedeniana 
Mecynoecia brevicula 
Mecynoecia buskii 
Mecynoecia carantina 
Mecynoecia clavaeformis 
Mecynoecia compressa 
Mecynoecia cornucopiae 
Mecynoecia cornuta 
Mecynoecia cretacea 
Mecynoecia cylindrica 
Mecynoecia dannevigi 
Mecynoecia delicatula 
Mecynoecia elongatotuba 
Mecynoecia exterogemma 
Mecynoecia filiformis 
Mecynoecia geinitzi 
Mecynoecia geminata 
Mecynoecia globula 
Mecynoecia icaunensis 
Mecynoecia iranensis 
Mecynoecia kaimi 
Mecynoecia labiata 
Mecynoecia latedistans 
Mecynoecia lobata 
Mecynoecia longipora 
Mecynoecia lunata 
Mecynoecia luvernensis 
Mecynoecia magnicella 
Mecynoecia montensis 
Mecynoecia obesa 
Mecynoecia ovata 
Mecynoecia parvituba 
Mecynoecia plauensis 
Mecynoecia proboscidea 
Mecynoecia proboscideoides 
Mecynoecia pulchella 
Mecynoecia pusilla 
Mecynoecia quisenberryae 
Mecynoecia ramosissima 
Mecynoecia rectangulata 
Mecynoecia repens 
Mecynoecia rustica 
Mecynoecia semota 
Mecynoecia smitti 
Mecynoecia soror 
Mecynoecia stipata 
Mecynoecia suprabajocina 
Mecynoecia tenuissima 
Mecynoecia thomasi

References

Bryozoan genera